Anagrus optabilis is a species of fairyfly. It is an egg parasitoid of Perkinsiella saccharicida, Sogatella furcifera, Nilaparvata lugens, and Nilaparvata muiri. Females are capable of reproducing through parthenogenesis, although the species does also sexually reproduce.

References

Mymaridae
Insects of Taiwan
Insects of Hawaii
Insects described in 1905